Casey Ryback (born August 6, 1953) is a fictional character and action hero from the Under Siege films of the 1990s. Played by Hollywood action star Steven Seagal, Ryback is a chief petty officer, culinary specialist and former Navy SEAL operator with top training in martial arts, explosives, special-weapons and tactics. He appears in the 1992 film Under Siege and its sequel, Under Siege 2: Dark Territory, in 1995.

Biography
CPO (SEAL) Casey Ryback, USN (Ret.), was a decorated leader of SEAL Team Four until losing security clearance, demoted to cook aboard USS Missouri. He struck his CO (Commanding Officer) after his SEAL teammates were killed because of poor intelligence during the invasion of Panama, Operation Nifty Package, in which they were sent to disable General Manuel Noriega's private jet at Punta Paitilla Airport.

At the end of the first film, his former position was given back to him in a ceremony following his bravery. At the beginning of the sequel, Ryback had retired from the Navy as a lieutenant, shown by the salute and verbal greeting from his driver in the beginning of the film. He worked as a chef at the Mile High Cafe in Denver, Colorado. According to his fictional Colorado's driving license, he has brown eyes, black hair and he is 6 ft 5 in (1.96 meters) tall and weighs around 220 lbs (100 kilograms).

At the end of the second film, when Ryback visits his brother's grave, he wears Navy Dress Whites with the shoulder boards of a Navy Lieutenant (O-3). This means he was awarded a direct commission after the events of the first film. In the original poster art of the first film, he wears shoulder boards of a flag officer. Not enough is shown to see one-star, two-star, or admiral. In the first film, he has the role of Chief.

As a SEAL, Ryback was awarded various U.S. military honors. His niece Sarah lists them as the Navy Cross, Silver Star and Purple Heart with clusters.  Ryback would also have earned the Special Warfare insignia, and other decorations during his 20 years of service mentioned in the first film, including the Armed Forces Expeditionary Medal for operations in Panama, and most likely the Navy's Marksmanship Medals.  The gold chief's stripes shown at the end of the first film also indicated multiple earning of the Navy's Good Conduct Medal.

In the first film, the mercenaries on the  do not know who Ryback is, believing he was just a mere cook. This added an element of surprise to the onslaught which followed. However, in the sequel, Under Siege 2, in which Ryback boards a train with his niece Sarah (Katherine Heigl) to visit a recently deceased brother James (Sarah's father) in Los Angeles from Denver, the mercenaries who hijack the train have full knowledge of the man they are dealing with once they hear his name. For the hand to hand combat, in the first film Ryback uses merely aikido techniques mixed with striking and kicking, while in the sequel, he implements moves used in combatives, such as the rear naked choke and the open guard.

Influence and reception
Casey Ryback became one of well known names of action heroes in the action film genre in the 1990s compared to the likes of John McClane from the Die Hard films.  As David West writes, Under Siege is "cut from the same cloth as the 'Die Hard' series and stars Seagal as Casey Ryback..."  The character of Ryback has been criticized in the media because he is invincible and would defeat his opponents rather too easily, removing the element of surprise in his personal combat.  As Eric Lichtenfeld writes, "Ryback...is the ultimate warrior.  As the action genre tends toward hyperbole, Ryback is an amalgam of everything that signifies Ultimate Warrior status, even more than Riggs had been in Lethal Weapon.  It is fitting then, that...Ryback's costuming progresses from a white cook's uniform...to an olive tank top, to the all-black garb that merges Ryback with the ship, and with which Seagal came to be identified.

References

External links
"Casey Ryback (Character) from Under Siege (1992) ," The Internet Movie Database.

Film characters introduced in 1992
Action film characters
Fictional chefs
Fictional United States Navy SEALs personnel
Fictional aikidoka
Fictional karateka
Fictional judoka
Fictional eskrimadors
Fictional military personnel in films
Fictional United States invasion of Panama veterans
Steven Seagal